Joyce Sombroek (born 10 September 1990) is a former Dutch goalkeeper of the field hockey team of the Netherlands. Her international debut was on June 29, 2010 and in total she played 117 caps (February 2, 2017). With the Dutch national team Sombroek won every title you can win as a professional field hockey player. Her biggest achievements are the gold medal at the 2012 Summer Olympics, silver medal at the 2016 Rio de Janeiro and winning the 2014 Women's Hockey World Cup in The Hague. In both Olympic semi finals Sombroek played an important role by stopping multiple shoot-outs and leading her team into the finals. Sombroek also won several individual titles. The Féderation Internationale de Hockey (FIH) chose her for the international All Star team in 2010 and 2011  and Sombroek was nominated for Best Young Player of the World in 2012. On top of that she was chosen as Best Goalkeeper of the World in 2014 and 2015.

In the highest National league of the Netherlands, the Hoofdklasse, she became vice-champion of the Netherlands in 2010, 2011 and 2012 with the first ladies team of Hockeyclub Laren. In this competition Sombroek got named 'Talent of the year' in 2010 and 'Best player of the year' in 2012. At the EuroHockey Club Champions Cup she and her teammates won a bronze medal in 2011, a gold medal in 2012 and a silver medal in 2013. Her last titles were the National Indoor Championships in 2018 and the EuroHockey Indoor Championships in 2019 in Hamburg.
 
Sombroek combined her career as a professional athlete with her medicine studies at the Vrije Universiteit in Amsterdam and is now working as a doctor. 
She also regularly gives presentations and is a devoted ambassador for several charities.

References

External links 
 
 

1990 births
Living people
Dutch female field hockey players
Female field hockey goalkeepers
Field hockey players at the 2012 Summer Olympics
Medalists at the 2012 Summer Olympics
Olympic field hockey players of the Netherlands
Olympic gold medalists for the Netherlands
Olympic medalists in field hockey
Sportspeople from Alkmaar
Field hockey players at the 2016 Summer Olympics
Medalists at the 2016 Summer Olympics
Olympic silver medalists for the Netherlands